Anorchia (also called anorchidism or anorchism) is a disorder of sex development in which a person with XY karyotype, which corresponds to male sex, is born without testes. Within a few weeks of fertilization, the embryo develops rudimentary gonads (testes), which produce hormones responsible for the development of the reproductive system. If the testes fail to develop within eight weeks, the baby will develop female genitalia (see Swyer syndrome). If the testes begin to develop but are lost or cease to function between eight and 10 weeks, the baby will have ambiguous genitalia when it is born. However, if the testes are lost after 14 weeks, the baby will have partial male genitalia with the notable absence of gonads.

Tests include observable lack of testes, low testosterone levels (typical female levels), elevated follicle stimulating hormone and luteinizing hormone levels, XY karyotype, ultrasound or magnetic resonance imaging showing absent gonadal tissue, low bone density, low anti-Müllerian hormone levels, and surgical exploration for evidence of male gonadal tissue.

Cause

Treatment
Treatment includes androgen (testosterone) supplementation to artificially initiate puberty, testicular prosthetic implantation, and psychological support. Gender dysphoria may result in anorchic individuals who are assigned male at birth and raised as male despite lacking the necessary masculinizing hormones during prenatal, childhood, and adolescent development. Anorchic individuals who have a female identity may be administered estrogen alone in place of testosterone as no androgen blockers are necessary due to the lack of gonads.

Terminology
Other names for anorchia include
 congenital anorchia
 vanishing testes syndrome
 vanishing testes
 empty scrotum
 testicular regression syndrome (TRS)

References

See also
 Cryptorchidism
 Monorchism
 Polyorchidism
 46 XX
 Aphallia

External links 

Congenital disorders of male genital organs
Testicle
Intersex variations